Eupithecia tabestana is a moth in the family Geometridae. It is found in eastern Afghanistan, northern Pakistan and central Nepal.

The wingspan is about 15–17 mm. The forewings are pale yellowish grey irrorated by light brown scales. The hindwings are yellowish grey, also irrorated by light brown scales.

References

Moths described in 2012
tabestana
Moths of Asia